Nebria frigida is a species of ground beetle in the Nebriinae subfamily that is native to the Palearctic realm and Russia. There, it is found in cities such as Altai, Chita, Kamchatka, Khabarovsk, the Ural Mountains, Krasnoyarsk, Magadan, north of western Siberia, and into Yakutiya. It is also common in the US state of Alaska.

References

frigida
Beetles described in 1844
Beetles of Europe
Beetles of North America